Eugeniusz Gaczkowski (born 3 January 1965 in Żnin) is a Polish former field hockey player who competed in the 2000 Summer Olympics.

References

External links

1965 births
Living people
Polish male field hockey players
Olympic field hockey players of Poland
Field hockey players at the 2000 Summer Olympics
2002 Men's Hockey World Cup players
People from Żnin County
Sportspeople from Kuyavian-Pomeranian Voivodeship